David Laʻamea Kahalepouli Kinoiki Kawānanakoa (February 19, 1868 – June 2, 1908) was a prince of the Hawaiian Kingdom and founder of the House of Kawānanakoa. Born into Hawaiian nobility, Kawānanakoa grew up the royal court of his uncle King Kalākaua and aunt Queen Kapiʻolani who adopted him and his brothers after the death of their parents. On multiple occasions, he and his brothers were considered as candidates for the line of succession to the Hawaiian throne after their cousin Princess Kaʻiulani but were never constitutionally proclaimed. He was sent to be educated abroad in the United States and the United Kingdom where he pioneered the sport of surfing. After his education abroad, he served as a political advisor to Kalākaua's successor, Queen Liliʻuokalani until the overthrow of the Hawaiian Kingdom in 1893. After Hawaii's annexation to the United States, he co-founded the Democratic Party of Hawaii.

Birth and family 
Kawānanakoa was born February 19, 1868, at Kaʻalaʻa at the mouth of the Pauoa Valley, in Honolulu, on the old homestead of his aunt Queen Kapiʻolani. Kawānanakoa was the first child of his father David Kahalepouli Piʻikoi from Kauaʻi island, and his mother Victoria Kinoiki Kekaulike, a noble from the district of Hilo who was later the royal governor of the island of Hawaiʻi. His younger brothers were Edward Abnel Keliʻiahonui (1869–1887) and Jonah Kūhiō Kalanianaʻole (1871–1922).

Both his parents were linked to the reigning House of Kalākaua. Kawānanakoa's mother was the youngest sister of Queen Kapiʻolani, consort to King Kalākaua, who ruled from 1874 to 1891. Kawānanakoa's father was also King Kalākaua's paternal first cousin.

His family was of the aliʻi class of the Hawaiian nobility and traced their descents to the ruling lines of each of the Hawaiian Islands prior to conquest. His mother's paternal line goes back to the ruling families of the island of Hawaiʻi while her maternal grandfather was King Kaumualiʻi, the last ruler of an independent Kauaʻi before its cession to King Kamehameha I who united the Hawaiian Kingdom in 1810. Kaumualiʻi was also descended from the ruling families of Maui and Oʻahu. Kawānanakoa's father's paternal line was descended from a junior line of Kauaʻi while his father’s mother maternal line also originated from the ruling line of Hawaiʻi Island.

His name Kawānanakoa translates as "fearless prophecy" in Hawaiian. Born with the surname Piʻikoi, Kawānanakoa and Kalanianaʻole (more commonly referred to as Kūhiō) later adopted their given Hawaiian names as their surname. Sources state the brothers either changed their names in 1883 or 1891.

Royal succession 
At a young age, Kawānanakoa and Kūhiō were hānai (informally adopted) by the childless Kapiʻolani and Kalākaua while the second brother Keliʻiahonui was hānai by their other maternal aunt  Poʻomaikelani.

After their father's death in 1878, his mother Kekaulike brought Kawānanakoa and his brothers to live in Honolulu. The family split their times living with the king and queen on the premise of the old ʻIolani Palace or at Kapiʻolani's private residence Pualeilani in Waikīkī where the Hyatt Regency Waikiki now stands. After the completion of the new palace in 1882, they occupied a in large second floor bedroom, which later became known as the "Imprisonment Room" because it was where Kalākaua's successor Queen Liliʻuokalani was imprisoned in 1895.

On February 10, 1883, Kawānanakoa was granted by letters patent the title of Prince and style of His Royal Highness by King Kalākaua along with his mother, brothers and aunt. On February 14, Kawānanakoa served as bearer of the crown and Kūhiō as either the bearer of the palaoa or the consort crown during Kalākaua's and Kapiʻolani's coronation ceremony at ʻIolani Palace.
After the death of Kekaulike in 1884, Kalākaua and Kapiʻolani assumed legal guardianship over all three boys.

In Kalākaua's will drafted in 1888, Kawānanakoa and his brother Kūhiō (their other brother Keliʻiahonui was deceased by this point) were included in a proposed line of succession after Liliʻuokalani, the king's niece Princess Kaʻiulani, Queen Kapiʻolani, and Princess Poʻomaikelani. The king also furthered outlined that he wished in the case that the throne passed to Kawānanakoa and his brother that hey "assume the name and title of Kalakaua, and to be numbered in order from" him.

On Article 22 of proposed 1893 Constitution of the Hawaiian Kingdom, Queen Liliʻuokalani outlined the succession to include Kaʻiulani followed by Kawānanakoa and Kūhiō and their legitimate heirs.

Education 
Kawānanakoa and his brothers were educated at St. Alban's College (now ʻIolani School) and Oahu College (now Punahou School). After completing their basic education in Hawaii, they also traveled abroad for further study. His uncle King Kalākaua championed future Hawaiian leaders attaining a broader education with his 1880 Hawaiian Youths Abroad program. The Hawaiian government sent Kawānanakoa and his brothers to attend Saint Matthew's School, a private Episcopal military school in San Mateo, California. Kawānanakoa was enrolled in the fall of 1884 and his younger brothers were enrolled in the spring of 1885. Keliʻiahonui fell ill at school and returned to Hawaii where he died. Kawānanakoa and Kūhiō returned to Hawaii shortly afterward. 

Kawānanakoa would also attend the Royal Agricultural College in Cirencester from 1890 to 1891.

While attending school in San Mateo, Kawānanakoa and his two brothers would travel south to the Pacific seashore at Santa Cruz. The brothers demonstrated the Hawaiian sport of board surfing to the locals, becoming the first California surfers in 1885. In September 1890, Kawānanakoa and Kūhiō became the first surfers in the British Isles and taught their English tutor John Wrightson to surf on the beaches of Bridlington in northern England.

Political career 

On August 31, 1891, Queen Liliʻuokalani appointed Kawānanakoa as a member of her Privy Council of State, a constitutionally-created advisory body purposed to advise and consent to acts made by the monarch. 
Kawānanakoa was also created Knight Grand Cross of the Royal Order of Kalākaua.

Liliʻuokalani was overthrown on January 17, 1893, and the Provisional Government of Hawaii established under pro-annexation leader Sanford B. Dole was officially recognized. The queen temporarily relinquished her throne to the United States, rather than the Dole-led government, in hopes that the United States would restore Hawaii's sovereignty to the rightful holder. A pro-annexationist delegation headed by Lorrin A. Thurston was sent by the provisional government for Washington D.C. on January 19, to lobby for immediate annexation by the United States. The queen wrote letters to President Benjamin Harrison and President-elect Grover Cleveland outlining her case. However, the provisional government refused the queen's request to send her own envoys on the same ship as their delegation. Liliʻuokalani appointed Kawānanakoa and her lawyer Paul Neumann to represent her case. Archibald Scott Cleghorn paid for the travel expenses of Edward C. Macfarlane, another of the queen's envoys, to protect the rights of his daughter Princess Kaʻiulani. Annexationist William Richards Castle, who was a commissioner on Thurston's delegation, described Kawānanakoa as "a very pleasant fellow," but, "of course, [is] purely ornamental."

The trio left Honolulu on the Australia on February 2, arrived in San Francisco on February 11, and reached Washington, DC, on February 17. Macfarlane and Kawānanakoa were dispatched to present the queen's letter to President-elect Cleveland. While in New York, Kawānanakoa also visited his cousin Princess Kaʻiulani, who was in the United States to protest the proposed annexation of Hawaii, with her guardian Theophilus Harris Davies. Dissent developed between Davies and Liliʻuokalani's representatives in the United States over Davies' influence over Kaʻiulani. Kawānanakoa along with Neumann, Macfarlane and John Mott-Smith, the Hawaiian Minister to the United States, voiced criticism at Davies' action in bringing Kaʻiulani to the United States without the consent of Cleghorn or the queen. Cleveland was inaugurated on March 4. The new president withdrew the treaty of annexation from the Senate on March 9 and appointed James Henderson Blount on March 11 as special commissioner to investigate the overthrow. Neumann, Macfarlane and Kawānanakoa returned on April 7.

After the formation of the Republic of Hawaii, Kawānanakoa became a supporter of the Royalist resistance and opposition to the overthrow of the monarchy. On January 6–9, 1895, supporters of the monarchy launched an unsuccessful counter-revolution led Robert William Wilcox to restore Liliʻuokalani to the throne. After the failed rebellion, the queen was imprisoned in the former bedrooms of the princes at ʻIolani Palace. Documents presented against the former queen at the subsequent trials included signed commissions for a restored monarchial government with Kawānanakoa and Kūhiō as governors of Maui and Kauai, respectively. A month after the rebellion, Kawānanakoa was arrested and jailed at Oahu Prison for misprision of treason on February 21. Kawānanakoa would be released due to lack of evidence. His brother Kūhiō played a more active role in the rebellion and was found guilty by a military tribunal and sentenced to one year imprisonment.

The Republic of Hawaii was annexed via the Newlands Resolution, a joint resolution of Congress, on July 7, 1898. The annexation ceremony was held on August 12, 1898, at the former ʻIolani Palace, now being used as the executive building of the government. President Dole handed over "the sovereignty and public property of the Hawaiian Islands" to United States minister Harold M. Sewall. The flag of Hawaii was lowered, and the flag of the United States was raised in its place. Liliʻuokalani with Kaʻiulani, Kawānanakoa and Kūhiō, their family members and retainers boycotted the event and shuttered themselves away at Washington Place, the private residence of Liliʻuokalani, in mourning. Many Native Hawaiians and royalists followed suit and refused to attend the ceremony.

Territory of Hawaii 

Following annexation, the Hawaiian Organic Act established the Territory of Hawaii.
Kawānanakoa became one of five founders of the Democratic Party of Hawaii.
He attended the 1900 Democratic National Convention in Kansas City, Missouri and was the first royal to attend a national presidential nominating convention, where he was successful in gaining affiliation between his party and the Democratic Party in a party vote at the convention to incorporate Hawaii. He voted to break a tie about inserting a plank into the convention platform regarding free silver.

The Democrats nominated Kawānanakoa to run for the position of delegate to the United States Congress for the Territory of Hawaii in 1900. He placed third behind the Home Rule Party victor Robert William Wilcox and the Republican nominated Samuel Parker. In the subsequent election cycle, his younger brother Kūhiō (who was a former member of the Home Rule Party) joined the Republicans while the Democrats including Kawānanakoa allied with Wilcox. There was allegedly no animosity between the two brothers over the political differences. Kūhiō ended winning the election becoming the first former royal prince to serve in the United States Congress.

Personal life 
Records indicate that there may have been a written agreement of betrothal with Princess Kaʻiulani, that was quickly aborted. An unsubstantiated announcement dated February 3, 1898, was printed in The San Francisco Call and later reprinted in newspapers across the United States. According to the report, the betrothal was dependent upon the finalization of deeds to a sizeable real estate holding, transferred from Queen Kapiʻolani to both Kawānanakoa and Kalanianaʻole. On February 19, a denial of betrothal from Kawānanakoa was printed in the newspapers. Kapiʻolani did deed all her property, real and personal, to the brothers on February 10, with the express stipulation that the documentation not be executed until she was ready. Kapiʻolani wanted to hold off the transfer until she was too old to manage the property herself, and/or otherwise would believe she was close to death. She last saw the document with her notary Carlos A. Long, with her instructions to have changes made in the wording. Instead, the brothers had the deed executed immediately, without her knowledge.

Family lore also conflicts over the exact nature of her relationship with Kawānanakoa. Kaʻiulani's niece Mabel Robertson Lucas said that the two cousins were close but only like siblings. Nancy and Jean Francis Webb's 1962 biography of Kaʻiulani says that Kawānanakoa's eventual wife told an unnamed biographer or close friend that "of course I never could have married David if Kaʻiulani had lived".

On January 6, 1902, Kawānanakoa married Abigail Wahiʻikaʻahuʻula Campbell in a Roman Catholic ceremony officiated by Patrick William Riordan, Archbishop of San Francisco at the Occidental Hotel. His wife was the eldest daughter of Scots-Irish industrialist James Campbell and Abigail Kuaihelani Maipinepine Bright, who refused to let her daughter marry the prince until he signed a prenuptial agreement. Two days prior, his mother-in-law had remarried to Kawānanakoa's former political rival Samuel Parker. After their marriage, Abigail assumed the courtesy title of princess. Their children were Princess Abigail Kapiʻolani (1903–1961), Prince David Kalākaua (1904–1953), and Princess Lydia Liliʻuokalani (1905–1969). His descendants which continues through his daughter Kapiʻolani are recognized by factions of the Hawaiian community as heirs to the Hawaiian throne.

Kawānanakoa converted to Roman Catholicism in 1907, no doubt through the urging of his wife.

Kawānanakoa died of pneumonia June 2, 1908, in San Francisco. After an elaborate funeral, he was buried in the Royal Mausoleum of Hawaii.

Notes

References

Bibliography 

 

 

 

 

 

 
 
 

 

 

1868 births
1908 deaths
Alumni of the Royal Agricultural University
Burials at the Royal Mausoleum (Mauna ʻAla)
Converts to Roman Catholicism from Anglicanism
Hawaii Democrats
Hawaiian Kingdom Roman Catholics
Hawaiian adoptees (hānai)
Hawaiian insurgents and supporters
House of Kalākaua
House of Kawānanakoa
ʻIolani School alumni
Members of the Hawaiian Kingdom Privy Council
Native Hawaiian surfers
Princes of Hawaii
Prisoners and detainees of the Republic of Hawaii
Punahou School alumni
Recipients of the Royal Order of Kalākaua
Recipients of the Royal Order of Kapiolani
Royalty of the Hawaiian Kingdom